Jacques Limouzy (29 August 1926 – 7 November 2021) was a French politician.

Limouzy was first elected to the National Assembly in 1967, to replace Antonin Tirefort, who did not run for reelection. Limouzy lost the 1969 legislative elections, but returned to office in 1973, and later served as deputy from 1975 to 1981 and between 1986 and 2002.

References

1926 births
2021 deaths
Deputies of the 3rd National Assembly of the French Fifth Republic
Deputies of the 4th National Assembly of the French Fifth Republic
Deputies of the 5th National Assembly of the French Fifth Republic
Deputies of the 6th National Assembly of the French Fifth Republic
Deputies of the 8th National Assembly of the French Fifth Republic
Deputies of the 9th National Assembly of the French Fifth Republic
Deputies of the 10th National Assembly of the French Fifth Republic
Deputies of the 11th National Assembly of the French Fifth Republic
People from Castres
Union for the New Republic politicians
Union of Democrats for the Republic politicians
Rally for the Republic politicians